The Turner and Amelia Smith House is a historic home in Willow Spring, Wake County, North Carolina, a suburb of Raleigh. The house was built about 1880, and is a two-story, three-bay, single-pile frame I-house with a central hall plan. It is sheathed in weatherboard, has a triple-A-roof, and a tall shed addition and hip-roofed front porch.

It was listed on the National Register of Historic Places in July 2005.

See also
 List of Registered Historic Places in North Carolina

References

Houses on the National Register of Historic Places in North Carolina
Houses completed in 1880
Houses in Wake County, North Carolina
National Register of Historic Places in Wake County, North Carolina